Danger Money is the second and final studio album by the progressive rock supergroup U.K., featuring John Wetton, Eddie Jobson and Terry Bozzio. It was released by E.G. Records / Polydor in March 1979. Early versions of "The Only Thing She Needs", "Caesar's Palace Blues" and "Carrying No Cross" (which had the opening chords to "Danger Money" in its intro) had been performed on tour throughout 1978 by the band's original line-up with Bill Bruford and Allan Holdsworth. "Rendezvous 6:02" and "Nothing to Lose" were both edited for single release.

The album was remastered in 2016 and included as part of the box-set Ultimate Collector's Edition.

Writing
John Wetton recalled of "Nothing to Lose" that "I [came] in with the bulk of it, [Eddie Jobson] rearranged two verses, and then I wrote the lyrics."

Recording
According to Eddie Jobson, the CS80 solo on "Rendezvous 6:02" was played with all 16 of the instrument's oscillators in monophonic unison.

Track listing

Personnel 
U.K.
 Eddie Jobson – keyboards, electric violin
 John Wetton –  bass, lead and backing vocals
 Terry Bozzio – drums, percussion

Singles 
 "Rendezvous 6:02" /"In the Dead of Night" (released in Europe) (NL #30)
 "Nothing to Lose"/ "In the Dead of Night" (Re-recorded version) (UK #67)

Chart positions

References 

U.K. (band) albums
1979 albums
Albums with cover art by Hipgnosis
E.G. Records albums